A list of films produced in Hong Kong in 1953:

1953

References

External links
 IMDB list of Hong Kong films
 Hong Kong films of 1953 at HKcinemamagic.com

1953
Hong Kong
Films